Perfectionism may refer to:
Perfectionism (psychology), a personality trait
Perfectionism (philosophy), a persistence of will
Christian perfection, a doctrine taught in Methodism and Quakerism 
Perfectionist movement; see Oneida Community, a Christian sect
Perfectionist (album), by Natalia Kills

See also
 Perfection (disambiguation)